Braedon Dean Bowman (born January 30, 1994) is an American football tight end for the New Jersey Generals of the United States Football League (USFL). He played college football at South Alabama and was signed by the Jacksonville Jaguars as an undrafted free agent in 2016.

Professional career

Jacksonville Jaguars
On May 1, 2016, Bowman signed with the Jacksonville Jaguars as an undrafted free agent. On September 3, 2016, he was released by the Jaguars.

New York Jets
On September 4, 2016, Bowman was claimed off waivers by the New York Jets. On September 13, he was waived by the Jets but was re-signed on September 23. He was placed on injured reserve on October 22, 2016 with a torn ACL.

On May 30, 2017, Bowman was waived by the Jets.

New Orleans Saints
On August 12, 2017, Bowman was signed by the New Orleans Saints. On September 2, 2017, Bowman was waived by the Saints.

Los Angeles Chargers
On September 6, 2017, Bowman was signed to the Los Angeles Chargers' practice squad. He was released on November 15, 2017, but was re-signed two days later. He signed a reserve/future contract with the Chargers on January 1, 2018.

On September 1, 2018, Bowman was waived by the Chargers.

Birmingham Iron
For 2019, Bowman joined the Birmingham Iron of the Alliance of American Football.  He was placed on injured reserve on February 14, 2019. He was activated from injured reserve on March 19. The league ceased operations in April 2019.

New Jersey Generals
Bowman was selected by the New Jersey Generals in the 34th round of the 2022 USFL Draft. He was transferred to the team's inactive roster on May 12 with a quadriceps injury.

References

External links
Jacksonville Jaguars bio
New York Jets bio

1994 births
Living people
Players of American football from Arizona
Sportspeople from Mesa, Arizona
American football tight ends
Scottsdale Fighting Artichokes football players
South Alabama Jaguars football players
Jacksonville Jaguars players
New York Jets players
New Orleans Saints players
Los Angeles Chargers players
Birmingham Iron players
New Jersey Generals (2022) players